Killing Hope: U.S. Military and CIA Interventions since World War II by William Blum is a history book on covert CIA operations and United States military interventions during the second half of the 20th century. The book takes a strongly critical view of American foreign policy.

The book covers various US foreign policy ventures from just after World War II onward. Its basic premise is that the American Cold War-era activities abroad were done with imperialist motives. It is an updated and revised version of one of Blum's previous works, The CIA - A Forgotten History (1986).

Critical reception 

Noam Chomsky called the book "far and away the best book on the topic." John Stockwell described it as "[t]he single most useful summary of CIA history", Ramsey Clark judged it a "valuable contribution", and International Security'''s Teresa Pelton Johnson wrote: "Blum has performed a very important service in collecting this information in one place, and the documentation is praiseworthy."

Ted Dace characterized Killing Hope as "[a] good, long look in the mirror".

Reviewing the earlier version of the book, Choice's R. H. Immerman wrote: "By falling prey to the same Manichean absolutism that has hamstrung US global policies, Blum has compromised the credibility of his work. He has nevertheless produced a valuable reference for anyone interested in the conduct of US foreign policy."

Julia Muravska, a policy expert for the RAND corporation, unfavorably compared Killing Hope with the work of academic historians such as William Keylor, stating that Blum's criticism of the U.S. occurs in an historical vacuum without any consideration for Soviet actions that "would have also helped the reader understand what drove the US foreign policy decisions that today's citizens find so morally repugnant." Although she noted that much of the book is "heavily and meticulously footnoted," Muravska harshly criticized the 2014 edition's "The American Empire Post-Cold War" chapter for "unsubstantiated claims" and shallow analysis, observing that "Blum relies on ... RT to make his case" regarding the post-2014 Russo-Ukrainian War.

 Editions 
First published in 1995, it has since been updated several times by the author.

 1998 revised edition (Black Rose Books) 
 2003 revised edition (Common Courage Press) 
 2004 Updated Edition (Common Courage Press) 
 2014 Updated Edition (Zed Books) 

See also
 Timeline of United States military operations
 United States involvement in regime change

References

 External links 
 Killing Hope at williamblum.org (contains online chapters)
 The CIA: A Forgotten History is an early version of Killing HopeKilling Hope - at killinghope.org (archive copy)Killing Hope'' PDF (archive.org)

1995 non-fiction books
Non-fiction books about the Central Intelligence Agency
Books about the Cold War
Books critical of capitalism